In mathematics, the Chern–Simons forms are certain secondary characteristic classes. The theory is named for Shiing-Shen Chern and James Harris Simons, co-authors of a 1974 paper entitled "Characteristic Forms and Geometric Invariants," from which the theory arose.

Definition
Given a manifold and a Lie algebra valued 1-form  over it, we can define a family of p-forms:

In one dimension, the Chern–Simons 1-form is given by 

In three dimensions, the Chern–Simons 3-form is given by 

In five dimensions, the Chern–Simons 5-form is given by 

where the curvature F is defined as 

The general Chern–Simons form  is defined in such a way that 

where the wedge product is used to define Fk. The right-hand side of this equation is proportional to the k-th Chern character of the connection .

In general, the Chern–Simons p-form is defined for any odd p.

Application to physics
In 1978, Albert Schwarz formulated Chern–Simons theory, early topological quantum field theory, using Chern-Simons form.

In the gauge theory, the integral of Chern-Simons form is a global geometric invariant, and is typically gauge invariant modulo addition of an integer.

See also
Chern–Weil homomorphism
Chiral anomaly
Topological quantum field theory
Jones polynomial

References

Further reading 

 
 

Homology theory
Algebraic topology
Differential geometry
String theory